Dame Ethel May Wormald DBE (née Robinson; born 19 November 1901 – died 23 February 1993) was a British politician, educationist and social activist. She was the second woman Lord Mayor of Liverpool. She was appointed a Dame Commander of the Order of the British Empire for her efforts.

Biography
She attended Leeds University on scholarship. After graduating she married Stanley Wormald. The couple had two sons. The family relocated to Liverpool after Stanley Wormald took up employment at the Liverpool Institute.

Political career/activism
She was involved the Personal Aid Society and the Socialist Educational Association. She stood in 1953 as a Labour candidate for Kensington, Liverpool. She served on the council  until 1968, chairing the Education Committee from 1955–61, and from 1963–67, when she became the second woman ever to be named as Lord Mayor of Liverpool.

She became a member of the Liverpool Regional Hospital Board and, while a member, fought to create a centre for mentally ill patients who were released from local hospitals without options. A few years before her death she moved to Bethesda, Wales with her younger son, Michael Wormald, a Labour councillor in Arfon for twelve years.

Death
She died at Bangor, Gwynedd on 23 February 1993, aged 91.

Legacy
The Ethel Wormald College, a day school which allows older students to train as teachers without spending extra time at residential colleges.

References

External links
National Register of Archives

1901 births
1993 deaths
Alumni of the University of Leeds
British activists
British women activists
British educational theorists
Mayors of Liverpool
Dames Commander of the Order of the British Empire
Politicians from Newcastle upon Tyne
People from Gwynedd
Politicians from Liverpool
Women mayors of places in England
20th-century British women politicians
20th-century English women
20th-century English people
Women councillors in England